Berriew Football Club is a Welsh football team based in Berriew. They played in the Ardal Leagues North East, which is in the third level of the Welsh football league system, but withdrew in July 2022 ahead of the 2022–23 season, and instead joined the tier four Central Wales North.

History
The club had been due to play in the Ardal NE for the 2022–23 season but withdrew in July 2022 after struggling to recruit the calibre of players required and stated that they would look to fill a vacancy in the Central Wales Northern Division left by the withdrawal of Churchstoke.

Honours

Mid Wales League – Champions: 1964–65
Mid Wales League – Runners-up: 2008–09, 2010–11
Mid Wales League Division Two: – Champions: 2015–16
Montgomeryshire League – Champions: 1960–61, 1987–88, 1990–91
Montgomeryshire League – Runners-up: 1949–50, 1982–83, 2002–03
Montgomeryshire League Division Two – Champions: 1981–82, 2000–01
Montgomeryshire League Division Two – Runners-up: 2001–02
Central Wales Challenge Cup – Winners: 2018–19
Montgomeryshire Cup – Runners-up: 2018–19

References

External links
Official Website

Football clubs in Wales
Association football clubs established in 1975
1975 establishments in Wales
Cymru Alliance clubs
Mid Wales Football League clubs
Ardal Leagues clubs
Montgomeryshire Football League clubs
Sport in Powys